Peter Henry Sweeney (born 25 September 1984) is a Scottish football manager, coach and former professional player.

Sweeney played as a midfielder and began his career at Millwall where he progressed through their youth team and broke into the first team. He played in the 2004 FA Cup Final were Millwall lost 3–0 to Manchester United. He joined Stoke City in the summer of 2005 for a fee of £250,000 but his start at Stoke was hampered by injuries. He struggled to fully recover and after spending time out on loan at Yeovil Town and Walsall he joined Leeds United in January 2008. After a brief spell at Elland Road Sweeney played for Grimsby Town, Bury, AFC Wimbledon, Dartford and Greenwich Borough.

Career

Millwall
Sweeney was born in Glasgow and moved with his family to London when he was three-years-old. He started his career at Millwall, where he made his debut in 2002, but he had to wait another year for his breakthrough. Sweeney played 34 times for Millwall in 2003–04 and he played a major role in the Lions' route to the 2004 FA Cup Final, where he started against Manchester United at the Millennium Stadium, Millwall lost 3–0. Following the cup final appearance, Millwall received a place in the UEFA Cup for the 2004–05 season, in which Sweeney played a part in the first round of the tournament, where they were defeated by Hungarian side Ferencvárosi.

Stoke City
On 1 July 2005 Sweeney signed for Stoke City for a fee of £250,000. His start at Stoke was hampered after he injured his back in a pre-season match against Newcastle Town, which ruled him out for the first three months of the 2005–06. Once he recovered from his injury Sweeney went on to play 20 times scoring once on the final day of the season against Brighton & Hove Albion.

He scored against Luton Town in a 2–2 draw early in the 2006–07 season but soon lost his place in the side and joined Yeovil Town on loan in January 2007. He played eight times for the Golvers before returning to Stoke in April 2007. On 22 November 2007 he signed a two-month loan deal at Walsall where he made seven appearances.

Leeds United
Early in the January 2008 transfer window Stoke accepted an undisclosed bid for the midfielder from Leeds United, with whom he swiftly agreed personally terms, and it was announced that he would sign, subject to a medical the following week. He finalised the move on 10 January, joining the club on a two–and–a–half–year deal. Despite starting in the last few games of Dennis Wise reign as Leeds manager, including making his debut away to Crewe and providing the assist for Jermaine Beckford's winning header, Sweeney failed to establish himself under managers Gary McAllister and Simon Grayson.

Grimsby Town
Sweeney made a loan move in March 2009 to Grimsby Town, signing until the end of the season, along with Bradford City forward Barry Conlon and fellow Leeds player Jonathan Lund. Sweeney went on to be part of a Grimsby side that would make a late surge in the league, and that would eventually stave off the threat of relegation from the Football League. Following the close of the 2008–09 season and the end of his loan spell, he was released from his contract at Leeds, following a one and a half year spell at the West Yorkshire club. On 3 July 2009, after much speculation, Sweeney re–signed for Grimsby on a two–year deal. He scored his first goal for The Mariners against Rotherham United in a 2–1 defeat at home. Sweeney then scored a superb volley against his former club Leeds in the third round of the Football League Trophy at Elland Road: a corner resulted in Leeds keeper Casper Ankergren punching the ball out to Sweeney, who smashed in a left foot volley from the edge of the area that crashed in off the underside of the crossbar; however Grimsby went on to lose the game 3–1. On 18 December, he scored another spectacular goal after hitting a dipping volley from the edge of the box in a 1–1 home draw with Morecambe. Sweeney continued to hold down a position in the centre of midfield throughout the 2009–10 season. On 12 May 2010, he was one of seven players placed on the transfer list by Grimsby manager Neil Woods after their relegation from the Football League.

Bury
Sweeney joined Bury on 25 June 2010 signing a two–year deal. Despite failing to hold down a regular starting place for "The Shakers" during the 2010–11 season, Sweeney performed consistently when called upon by manager Alan Knill. Following Knill's departure, Sweeney entered the fold under Richie Barker following suspensions and injuries to regular midfield duo Damien Mozika and Steven Schumacher eventually helping the club to earn promotion from League Two. Sweeney made 41 appearances in League One, scoring 4 goals during the 2011–12 season and made 21 appearances, scoring 1 goal, in all competitions during the 2012–13 season for Bury before being sold to AFC Wimbledon on 8 January 2013. During his time at Bury, Sweeney made a total of 95 appearances, which is the most games he has ever played for one club.

AFC Wimbledon
On 8 January 2013 Sweeney signed for League Two side AFC Wimbledon for a free transfer. After only seven appearances for "The Dons", Sweeney suffered a broken foot in a game against Northampton Town on 19 February 2013 at Kingsmeadow|The Cherry Red Records Stadium. The injury put him out of action for the remainder of the 2012–2013 season. He returned during AFC Wimbledon's 2013–2014 pre–season campaign, scoring in a behind closed doors game against Gillingham on 2 July 2013 that ended 2–1 to "The Gills". Sweeney came on as a substitute for Harry Pell in AFC Wimbledon's next friendly game against Dartford on 6 July 2013 at Princes Park, the game ended 2–2.

Dartford
In August 2014, he signed for Conference Premier side Dartford on a one-year contract. In May 2015, Sweeney was released by the club following relegation to the National League South and the expiration of his contract.

Later career
Following his release from Dartford Sweeney joined Greenwich Borough in June 2015.

Coaching career
In October 2017, Sweeney moved to Glebe as to take on the role of assistant manager, working with Anwar Uddin. He was appointed manager in January 2019, but resigned in September the same year.

Controversies
In May 2019, Sweeney's former Grimsby Town teammate Paul Linwood appeared on the 'I Had Trials Once' podcast on Spotify, in the interview he spoke about his time at the club during the 2009–10 season. Linwood went on to explain that the team was "full of alcoholics" and spoke of instances where the drinking culture at the club got out of hand during the season Grimsby Town finished 23rd in League Two and were relegated from the Football League for the first time in their 122-year history.

Career statistics

Honours
Millwall
FA Cup runner-up: 2003–04

Stoke City
 Football League Championship runner–up: 2007–08

Bury
 Football League Two runner–up: 2010–11

References

External links

Scotland U21 profile at Fitbastats
Scotland B profile at Fitbastats

1984 births
Footballers from Glasgow
Living people
Association football midfielders
Scottish footballers
Scotland under-21 international footballers
Scotland B international footballers
Millwall F.C. players
Stoke City F.C. players
Yeovil Town F.C. players
Walsall F.C. players
Leeds United F.C. players
Grimsby Town F.C. players
Bury F.C. players
AFC Wimbledon players
Dartford F.C. players
Greenwich Borough F.C. players
English Football League players
National League (English football) players
Glebe F.C. managers
Scottish football managers
Footballers from Greater London
Anglo-Scots
FA Cup Final players